Webflow, Inc. is an American company, based in San Francisco, that provides software as a service for website building and hosting. Their online visual editor platform allows users to design, build, and launch websites. According to W3Techs, Webflow is used by 0.6% of the top 10 million websites.

Overview
Webflow is a SaaS application that allows designers to build responsive websites with browser-based visual editing software. While designers use the tool, Webflow automatically generates HTML, CSS, and JavaScript.

Websites built on Webflow are powered by Amazon Cloudfront and hosted on Fastly. Webflow is an all-in-one platform with a CMS built in. It does not require external plugins.

Company
Webflow was founded in 2013 by Vlad Magdalin (creator of Intuit Brainstorm), Sergie Magdalin, and Bryant Chou (former CTO of Vungle Inc.). The company graduated from Y Combinator's startup accelerator in 2013. Webflow raised venture funding from Khosla Ventures, Y Combinator, Tim Draper, and other tech industry investors. In 2019, Webflow raised a $72 million series A round of funding led by Accel. In January 2021, Webflow raised $140 million in a series B round of funding.

Other competitors in the website building industry include Squarespace, Weebly, and Wix.com

References

Web design
Y Combinator companies
HTML editors
Automated WYSIWYG editors
Web development software